Dichocrocis festivalis is a moth in the family Crambidae. It was described by Charles Swinhoe in 1886. It is found in Mumbai, India.

References

Moths described in 1886
Spilomelinae